Lig is a dispersed settlement in the hills northwest of Kanal in the Littoral region of Slovenia. It lies on the border with Italy and is made up of the smaller settlements of  Lig, Kostanjevica, and Strmec, as well as a few remote farmsteads in the Kanal Kolovrat range.

Church

The parish church in the area known as Marijino Celje is dedicated to Saint Zeno and The Holy Name of Mary. It is a popular pilgrimage church and belongs to the Diocese of Koper. A second church belonging to this parish is built in the Lig area and is dedicated to Saint Anthony of Padua.

References

External links
Lig on Geopedia
Lig on the Kanal Tourist Information site

Populated places in the Municipality of Kanal